Alberto Enrique Acosta Palma (born 8 April 1973) is a Mexican diver. He competed in the 1992 and 1996 Summer Olympics.

References

1973 births
Living people
Divers at the 1992 Summer Olympics
Divers at the 1996 Summer Olympics
Mexican male divers
Olympic divers of Mexico
Pan American Games silver medalists for Mexico
Divers at the 1995 Pan American Games
Medalists at the 1995 Pan American Games
Pan American Games medalists in diving
20th-century Mexican people
21st-century Mexican people